Kristen Angela Johnston (born September 20, 1967) is an American actress. Best known for her work on television sitcoms, she twice won the Primetime Emmy Award for Outstanding Supporting Actress in a Comedy Series for her role as Sally Solomon in 3rd Rock from the Sun. She starred as divorce attorney Holly Franklin on The Exes, and as recovering addict Tammy Diffendorf on Mom. She has also appeared in such films as Austin Powers: The Spy Who Shagged Me (1999), The Flintstones in Viva Rock Vegas (2000), Ice Age (2002), Music and Lyrics (2007), and Bride Wars (2009).

Education

Johnston earned a Bachelor of Fine Arts degree in drama at New York University.

Career
Johnston made her professional stage debut with New York's Atlantic Theater Company, founded by playwright David Mamet, where she appeared in many productions including As You Like It and Stage Door. She performed with the Naked Angels Theater Company in The Stand-In and Hot Keys, and with New York Stage and Film in Kim's Sister with David Strathairn and Jane Adams. For her performance in The Lights at Lincoln Center Theater, she was nominated for a Drama Desk Award for Best Supporting Actress.

A Carsey-Werner casting agent who saw her in The Lights recommended her for the role of Sally Solomon on the TV series 3rd Rock from the Sun. After numerous auditions in 1996, she won the part and starred on the show from 1996 to 2001, winning two Emmy Awards for Outstanding Supporting Actress in a Comedy Series.

She made her feature film debut in The Debt, winner of Best Short at the 1993 Cannes Film Festival. In 1995, she played Kate in the film Backfire! She played Esmeralda, a sea hag in Thrill Ride, a family friendly film released in 2016. Her other television credits include guest-starring roles on Chicago Hope, Hearts Afire, and The 5 Mrs. Buchanans. She narrated Microscopic Milton on the Disney Channel. Her significant roles in commercially successful movies include Austin Powers: The Spy Who Shagged Me in 1999, Ice Age, and Music and Lyrics in 2007. In 1998, she was a spokesmodel for the Clairol company.

Johnston appeared in the sixth and final season of Sex and the City. In the "Splat!" episode, her character, Lexi Featherston, an aging party girl, accidentally falls out of a window and dies (after saying, "I'm so bored I could die"), prompting Carrie Bradshaw (played by Sarah Jessica Parker) to reexamine her life. In 2005, Johnston was featured in six episodes of NBC's ER. She was cast as Patsy in a proposed American remake of the British TV series Absolutely Fabulous, but it was never picked up by a network. She had a recurring role in the 2009 season of Ugly Betty, and had a single-episode appearance as a dominatrix in the second season opener of Bored to Death.

She starred in the TV Land sitcom The Exes, which ran for four seasons from November 30, 2011 to September 16, 2015. In 2018, she began a recurring role on the CBS sitcom Mom, and was upgraded to series regular for season 7 (2019–2020).

Personal life
Her father was former Wisconsin  Republican state senator Rod Johnston.

In her autobiography, Guts: The Endless Follies and Tiny Triumphs of a Giant Disaster (2012), Johnston discusses an addiction to alcohol and pills that began when she was in high school. She wrote that at the height of her addiction, she drank on average two bottles of wine per evening, and that she had been sober for five years. Through her charity SLAM, NYC (Sobriety, Learning and Motivation), she mentors high school girls from New York City with addiction and self-esteem issues and has campaigned for the city to build a recovery high school.

Johnston said she was diagnosed in November 2013 with lupus myelitis, which caused her to miss filming some episodes of her series The Exes. A character played by Leah Remini was introduced in season 3 to cover her absence.

Filmography

Film

Television

Stage

Awards and nominations

Autobiography 
 2012: Guts: The Endless Follies and Tiny Triumphs of a Giant Disaster, Gallery Books,

References

External links

2006 Interview with Johnston on Theatre.com
Kristen Johnston Downstage Center interview American Theatre Wing, October 2007

1967 births
American film actresses
American television actresses
American voice actresses
Living people
Actresses from Washington, D.C.
Circle in the Square Theatre School alumni
Tisch School of the Arts alumni
Outstanding Performance by a Supporting Actress in a Comedy Series Primetime Emmy Award winners
20th-century American actresses
21st-century American actresses
New York University faculty
American autobiographers
Writers from Washington, D.C.
American stage actresses
Women autobiographers
People from Fox Point, Wisconsin
Whitefish Bay High School alumni